Ruben R. Nembhard (born February 20, 1972) is an American former professional basketball player who played in the National Basketball Association (NBA). A 6'3" (1.90 m), 208 lb (94 kg) guard, he last played in the Venezuelan LPB for Gaiteros del Zulia.

Born in The Bronx, New York, Nembhard attended Weber State University and Paris Junior College, and had a brief career in the NBA, playing for the Portland Trail Blazers and the Utah Jazz. During the 1997–98 season he played with Iraklis Thessaloniki B.C. having 18.2 points average. Nembhard played for the Fargo-Moorhead Beez of the Continental Basketball Association (CBA) during the 2001–02 season and was selected to the All-CBA First Team. He also played 12 games for the Townsville Crocodiles of the Australian NBL in 2003–04.

Nembhard and his wife Terri have two children, son RJ and daughter Jayden.

References

External links
NBA stats @ basketballreference.com
Nembhard – Weber State basketball fans site @ wsubball.com
at esake.gr

1972 births
Living people
20th-century African-American sportspeople
21st-century African-American sportspeople
African-American basketball players
American expatriate basketball people in Australia
American expatriate basketball people in Venezuela
American men's basketball players
Basketball players from New York City
Fargo-Moorhead Beez (CBA) players
Gaiteros del Zulia players
Iraklis Thessaloniki B.C. players
Paris Dragons basketball players
Portland Trail Blazers players
San Diego Stingrays players
Shooting guards
Sportspeople from the Bronx
Townsville Crocodiles players
Undrafted National Basketball Association players
Utah Jazz players
Weber State Wildcats men's basketball players
Yakima Sun Kings players